Gottschalck is a surname. Notable people with the surname include:

 Camilla Gottschalck (born 1977), Danish composer, singer, musician, and actress
 Ulrike Gottschalck (born 1955), German politician

See also
 Gottschalk